Sony Pictures Animation Inc. is an American animation studio owned by Sony Entertainment's Sony Pictures Entertainment through their Motion Picture Group division and founded on May 9, 2002. The studio's films are distributed worldwide by Sony Pictures Releasing under their Columbia Pictures label, while all direct-to-video releases are released by Sony Pictures Home Entertainment.

The first film produced by the studio, Open Season, was released on September 29, 2006, and their most recent film was Hotel Transylvania: Transformania on January 14, 2022. Their upcoming slate of films includes Spider-Man: Across the Spider-Verse on June 2, 2023, and Spider-Man: Beyond the Spider-Verse on March 29, 2024.

History
In 2001, Sony Pictures considered selling off its visual effects facility Sony Pictures Imageworks but after failing to find a suitable buyer, having been impressed with the CGI sequences of Stuart Little 2 and seeing the box office successes of DreamWorks Animation's Shrek and Disney/Pixar's Monsters, Inc., SPI was reconfigured to become an animation studio. Astro Boy, which had been in development at Sony since 1997 as a live-action film, was set to be SPI's first all-CGI film, but never made it to fruition. On May 9, 2002, Sony Pictures Animation was established to develop characters, stories and movies with SPI taking over the digital production while maintaining its visual effects production. Meanwhile, SPI produced two short films, the Academy Award-winning The ChubbChubbs! and Early Bloomer, as a result of testing its strengths and weaknesses in producing all-CGI animation.

On its first anniversary on May 9, 2003, Sony Pictures Animation announced a full slate of animated projects in development: Open Season, an adaptation of a Celtic folk ballad Tam Lin, Cloudy with a Chance of Meatballs, Surf's Up, and a feature-length film version of The ChubbChubbs!.

On November 3, 2014, the studio collaborated with Frederator Studios' Cartoon Hangover on GO! Cartoons, an incubator series consisting of 12 short films, with at least one short film being developed into a series. The short films were funded by SPA, with the additional goal of attracting new talent for the studio.

In June 2019, Sony Pictures Animation announced that they had launched an "International" division headed by Aron Warner at the 2019 Annecy International Animated Film Festival, with Wish Dragon set to be the division's first film. The same day, they also announced an "Alternative" division aimed at producing adult animated content, headed by Katie Baron and Kevin Noel. In addition to Tartakovsky's films Black Knight and Fixed, the division's TV shows are set to include The Boondocks, a reboot of the original TV series that originally aired on Cartoon Network's Adult Swim programming block from 2005 to 2014; Superbago, a co-production with Stoopid Buddy Stoodios that was originally greenlit as a feature film; and Hungry Ghosts, a series based on the Dark Horse graphic novel by Anthony Bourdain and Joel Rose. They had previously announced their plans to produce adult content at the 2017 Annecy festival.

According to Kristine Belson, president of SPA, the studio produces films on a 1:1 development-to-production ratio, meaning that the studio puts films into development as much as it places films in production, unlike other animation studios.

Following the support of video game works, Pixelopus is partnering with SPA, working an untitled PS5-exclusive video game with Unreal Engine 5.

Projects
Sony Pictures Animation's first feature film was Open Season, released in September 2006, which became Sony's second-highest-grossing home entertainment film in 2007 and spawned three direct-to-video sequels. Its second feature film, Surf's Up was released in June 2007, was nominated for an Academy Award for Best Animated Feature, and won two Annie Awards. SPA's first 3D movie since the IMAX 3D release of Open Season, Cloudy with a Chance of Meatballs, was released in September 2009 and was nominated for four Annie Awards, including Best Animated Feature. The Smurfs (2011) was the studio's first CGI/live-action hybrid. SPA's parent company Sony Pictures had partnered in 2007 with Aardman Animations to finance, co-produce and distribute feature films. Together, they produced two films: Arthur Christmas (2011), and The Pirates! In an Adventure with Scientists! (2012), the latter which was SPA's first stop-motion film. In 2012, SPA released Hotel Transylvania, which grossed over $350 million worldwide and launched a successful franchise with three sequels and a TV series. Two sequels were released in 2013: The Smurfs 2 and Cloudy with a Chance of Meatballs 2. 

SPA's latest releases are Spider-Man: Into the Spider-Verse, an animated superhero film based on the Spider-Man comics and featuring the Miles Morales incarnation of the character, The Angry Birds Movie 2, a sequel to the 2016 film The Angry Birds Movie produced by Rovio Animation, The Mitchells vs. the Machines, a robot apocalypse/road trip film written and directed by Michael Rianda and Jeff Rowe while produced by longtime collaborators Phil Lord and Christopher Miller, Wish Dragon, a co-production with Base FX, and the musical film, Lin-Manuel Miranda's Vivo, which marks Sony Pictures Animation's first musical film. SPA has since signed Genndy Tartakovsky to a long-term deal with the studio to develop and direct original films.

Upcoming projects
, the studio is working on projects such as Spider-Man: Across the Spider-Verse, which will be released on June 2, 2023, and its sequel Spider-Man: Beyond the Spider-Verse on March 29, 2024. It has as well other projects in development, including an animated Ghostbusters spin-off film; a musical comedy K-Pop: Demon Hunters; another R-rated comedy Bubble, a co-production with Point Grey Pictures based on the podcast of the same name, Tao, a China-set science-fiction adventure film directed by The Lego Movie 2 story artist Emily Dean, and Tut, an afro-futuristic coming-of-age story set in ancient Egypt directed by Hair Love creator Matthew A. Cherry.

Process
In a similar fashion to the Warner Animation Group and Paramount Animation, the studio outsources their films to other animation companies and visual effects studios, with the majority of their films being animated by Sony Pictures Imageworks (its sister company). Some films, such as Arthur Christmas and The Pirates! Band of Misfits were acquired by Sony Pictures Animation to be released under their banner while others, such as Goosebumps and Peter Rabbit, were made with no involvement from the studio.

Franchises

Filmography

See also
 Adelaide Productions
 Sony Pictures Imageworks
 Sony Pictures Television Kids
 Screen Gems Cartoons
 Sony Pictures Kids Zone
 United Productions of America
 List of Sony theatrical animated feature films
 List of unproduced Sony Pictures Animation projects

Notes

References

External links

 
 

 
2002 establishments in California
American companies established in 2002
Mass media companies established in 2002
Sony Pictures Entertainment
Sony subsidiaries
American animation studios
Film production companies of the United States
Entertainment companies based in California
Companies based in Culver City, California